Margaret Anne Sinclair, PCC (29 March 1900 – 24 November 1925) also known as Sister Mary Francis of the Five Wounds, was a Scottish Catholic nun, a member of the Colettine Poor Clares. She was declared "Venerable" by Pope Paul VI on 6 February 1978.

Life

Margaret Sinclair was baptised at St Patrick's Church on 11 April, 1900. On 8 May 1910, she was confirmed in St Patrick's Church, Edinburgh and received the Eucharist for the first time.

Both her older brother John and her father served in World War I. Sinclair left school at the age of fourteen and, from 1914 to 1918, worked full-time at Waverley Cabinet Works as an apprentice French polisher, and became an active member of her trade union.

The Scottish economy had been heavily dependent upon the war; a depression followed the end of the Great War. Many activities necessary for the war economy, such as arms production and ship construction, no longer played a major role in the Scottish Economy; the skills required to undertake these tasks were not easily transferable to the civilian economy. Margaret was unemployed, and by 1918 the Waverley Cabinet Works had shut its doors. She would later find work in a biscuit factory run by McVitie.

In 1922, seeking a life of solitude and prayer, Margaret applied to join the Poor Clares in Notting Hill, London.

Sister Mary Francis of the Five Wounds

On 21 July 1923, Margaret and her brother Andrew travelled to London. The two would say goodbyes; Andrew was emigrating to Canada while Margaret would enter the convent of the Colettine Poor Clares in Notting Hill. Upon entrance to the convent, she took the name "Sister Mary Francis of the Five Wounds" after Mary Frances of the Five Wounds and asked to become cloistered. Many members of the religious community doubted Sinclair's ability to live a cloistered life owing to her humble heritage.

Margaret contracted tuberculosis of the throat and was admitted to a sanatorium run by the Sisters of Charity at Warley, Essex, on 9 April 1925, where she remained until her death on 24 November that same year, and was buried at Kensal Green in north west London. On 22 December 1927 her body was re-interred at Mount Vernon, Liberton, Edinburgh. On 25 October 2003 her remains were again removed and now lie in her home parish church, dedicated to Saint Patrick, in Edinburgh.

The marble slab covering her body has a low relief sculpture of her head in the centre of a cross, but is hard to view unless directly above, as it is white on white.

Veneration
On 6 February 1978, 100 years after Scotland's Roman Catholic hierarchy was restored Margaret Sinclair was declared Venerable by Pope Paul VI. The cause for her canonisation has continued since then; on 1 June 1982, Pope John Paul II said, "Margaret could well be described as one of God's little ones, who through her very simplicity, was touched by God with the strength of real holiness of life, whether as a child, a young woman, an apprentice, a factory worker, a member of a Trade Union or a professed Sister of religion'".

St. Patrick's Church in Old Town, Edinburgh contains the National Shrine of the Venerable Margaret Sinclair.

References

External links
 Margaret Sinclair b. 1900 at sinclair.quarterman.org
 Independent Catholic News at www.indcatholicnews.com
 Address Of John Paul II During The Visit To Saint Joseph's Hospital, Edinburgh, Tuesday, 1 June 1982

1900 births
1925 deaths
20th-century deaths from tuberculosis
Tuberculosis deaths in England
People from Edinburgh
Poor Clares
Scottish Roman Catholics
Scottish Roman Catholic religious sisters and nuns
Venerated Catholics
20th-century venerated Christians